Rugby union in Mongolia is a minor but growing sport. Mongolia is represented in international matches by the Mongolia national rugby union team, which compete in the annual Asian Five Nations tournament.

Governing body 
The governing body is the Mongolian Rugby Football Union (MRFU), which was established in 2003.

History
Rugby was first introduced into Mongolia from the Soviet Union's Red Army, where it was a moderately popular sport.

The first ever official match of Mongolia was played at 9 June 2009, for the Asian Five Nations, Division II, in Tashkent, Uzbekistan, with Kyrgyzstan, finishing with a respectable 21–38 loss. Mongolia takes part in the regional sections of the Asian Five Nations

There are currently 8 clubs in existence.

See also 
 Mongolia national rugby union team

References

External links 
 IRB Mongolia page 
 Rugby in Asia, Mongolia page
 Asian Rugby Football Union
 Mongolian Team To Play In 2008 Ice Breaker in Beijing
  Mongolian rugby sportsmen to take part in Beijing open
 Archives du Rugby: Mongolie